The SIG Sauer P239 is a semi-automatic pistol designed and manufactured by SIG Sauer—both SIG Sauer GmbH in Germany and SIG Sauer Inc. of New Hampshire, United States. It was produced from 1996 to 2018, and offered in three calibers: 9×19mm Parabellum, .357 SIG and .40 S&W. The P239 became popular in the United States as a concealed carry pistol.

Specifications
The included single-stack magazine has a capacity of 8 rounds (9×19mm) or 7 rounds (.357 SIG or .40 S&W). The P239 was initially available as double action / single action (DA/SA); later, it was also offered as double-action only (DAO).

Variants

P239 DAK – this variant has a Double Action Kellerman (DAK) trigger.

P239 SAS – a SIG Anti-Snag (SAS) variant with "an ultra smooth, snag free profile" for concealed carry.

P239 Tactical – this variant includes a  threaded barrel (for use with a suppressor), short reset trigger (SRT), and optional 10-round extended magazine; it is only chambered in 9×19mm Parabellum.

Users
In 2004, the U.S. Immigration and Customs Enforcement (ICE) contracted with SIG Sauer for the purchase of up to 65,000 pistols, among them double-action only (DAO) model .40 caliber P239s.

The US Navy's Naval Criminal Investigative Service (NCIS) purchased P239 pistols in .40 caliber (along with P229 pistols with Double Action Kellerman triggers) to replace their aging 9mm M11 pistols.

References

External links

 
 SIG Sauer P239: The Gun You Love, But Don't Need via YouTube

.357 SIG semi-automatic pistols
9mm Parabellum semi-automatic pistols
.40 S&W semi-automatic pistols
SIG Sauer semi-automatic pistols
Semi-automatic pistols of Germany
Semi-automatic pistols of the United States
Weapons and ammunition introduced in 1996
Police weapons